The Juan de Fuca Marine Trail is a rugged  wilderness hiking trail located within Juan de Fuca Provincial Park along the southwestern coast of Vancouver Island. The trail stretches from China Beach, 35 km west of Sooke, to Botanical Beach, just outside Port Renfrew.

Panoramic views of the coastline, Juan de Fuca Strait and the Olympic Mountains can be seen from many points along this rainforest trail.  Lucky are those who spot a pod of whales, but it is not uncommon to view sea lions, bald eagles, herons and other wildlife. It is a stunning trail of moderate difficulty.

The trail can be hiked in part, as a day hike, or backpacked in its entirety in four to six days. Unlike the longer West Coast Trail, the Juan de Fuca Trail does not require a reservation; however, there is a backcountry camping fee of $10 per person/per night. It is also suggested to plan ahead if travelling with a large group. Some campsites are quite small and so arriving early to guarantee a spot is highly recommended.

Main trailheads

 China Beach
 Sombrio Beach
 Parkinson Creek
 Botanical Beach

Each is car-accessible and has a parking lot.

Intermediate trailheads

 Mystic Beach
 Bear Beach
 Magdalena Point
 China Beach

Each is accessible by parking along Highway 14 and hiking down an unmarked side trail.

Establishment

The Juan de Fuca Marine Trail was created by Parks Canada, originally intended to be part of the Trans Canada Trail. The work was done by Island Green Forestry. Control was given over to BC Parks. In 2001 the B.C. government claimed the trail was built to honour the 1994 Commonwealth Games, but that is debatable.

Threat to the integrity of the trail

In January 2007, the provincial B.C. Liberal government removed 500 hectares of land from tree farm licences (TFLs) on the southwestern coast of Vancouver Island to allow Western Forest Products (WFP) to sell the land for residential development.  Despite a subsequent report by the provincial auditor general condemning the decision as having been made "without sufficient regard for the public interest," the government stood by the move.

As a result of the TFL deletions, Vancouver-based businessman Ender Ilkay purchased  of land from WFP and subsequently proposed a 257-cabin resort bordering 12 km of the Juan de Fuca Trail.  The project faced broad opposition from citizens, community groups, environmentalists, and First Nations.

In September 2011, the Capital Regional District (CRD) voted to deny the developer's rezoning application, effectively blocking the project.

References

Further reading

External links

Juan de Fuca Marine Trail Map
Tidal Predictions for Port Renfrew (Fisheries and Oceans Canada)
Victoria Club Tread: Juan de Fuca Marine Trail
Juan de Fuca Trail - key information like beach cut-offs and GPX files

Hiking trails in British Columbia
Juan de Fuca region